Meldia Rock (‘Skala Meldia’ \ska-'la 'mel-di-ya\) is the rock of diameter 220 m and split in east-west direction, lying off the northwest coast of Nelson Island in the South Shetland Islands, Antarctica.  The area was visited by early 19th century sealers.

The rock is named after the ancient Roman station of Meldia in Western Bulgaria.

Location
British mapping in 1968.

See also
 List of Antarctic and subantarctic islands

Maps
 Livingston Island to King George Island.  Scale 1:200000.  Admiralty Nautical Chart 1776.  Taunton: UK Hydrographic Office, 1968.
 South Shetland Islands. Scale 1:200000 topographic map No. 3373. DOS 610 - W 62 58. Tolworth, UK, 1968.
Antarctic Digital Database (ADD). Scale 1:250000 topographic map of Antarctica. Scientific Committee on Antarctic Research (SCAR). Since 1993, regularly upgraded and updated.

References
 Meldia Rock. SCAR Composite Gazetteer of Antarctica
 Bulgarian Antarctic Gazetteer. Antarctic Place-names Commission. (details in Bulgarian, basic data in English)

External links
 Meldia Rock. Copernix satellite image

Rock formations of the South Shetland Islands
Bulgaria and the Antarctic